Alena Polozkova (born 11 August 1979) is a Belarusian former gymnast. She competed at the 1996 Summer Olympics and the 2000 Summer Olympics.

Competitive history

References

External links
 

1979 births
Living people
Belarusian female artistic gymnasts
Olympic gymnasts of Belarus
Gymnasts at the 1996 Summer Olympics
Gymnasts at the 2000 Summer Olympics
People from Mogilev
Sportspeople from Mogilev Region